Dripsey Castle is a country house in the townland of Carrignamuck, situated  north-east of Coachford village and  north-west of Dripsey village. The house and demesne were dominant features in the rural landscape of Ireland, throughout the eighteenth and nineteenth centuries. Location often reflected the distribution of better land, and this is evidenced in mid-Cork, where many of these houses are situated along the valley of the River Lee and its tributaries.

The National Inventory of Architectural Heritage describes it as a detached, seven-bay, three-storey country house, built c. 1740, and having a central pedimented three-bay breakfront, a canted bay window on its southern side, and a three-bay, two-storey, flat-roofed wing on its northern side with recent extension. A farm complex of single and double-storey buildings lies to the west, having a central pedimented breakfront which reflects the design of the main house. Building continuity is evident, from the eighteenth century to the later north-wing addition of the twentieth century. Historic features include timber sash windows, a Venetian window in the breakfront, and a timber-panelled door. Dripsey Castle forms part of a larger group of demesne structures along the Dripsey River. The Archaeological Inventory of County Cork describes the house as being of late-eighteenth-century appearance, with the central door approached by a flight of stone steps.

Dripsey Castle originally dates from the 15th century, when it was commissioned by Cormac McTeige MacCarthy, 9th Lord of Muskerry, who also built Blarney and Kilcrea Castles.

It was once the residence of the Colthurst family. Lewis (1837) describes it as 'Dripsey House, the residence of J.H. Colthurst, Esq'. The Ordnance Survey name book (c. 1840) refers both to the 'house and demesne' of Dripsey Castle as a gentleman's seat and to John Henry Colthurst, Esq. The mid-nineteenth-century Primary Valuation of Ireland (Griffith's Valuation) records John H. Colthurst as occupying c. 194 acres in Carrignamuck townland, consisting of a 'house, offices, and land', with the lessor being Margaret Colthurst.

Descendants of the Colthurst family occupied Dripsey Castle from the late eighteenth century to the early twentieth century. John Colthurst of Dripsey Castle married Jane Bowen of Oak Grove, Carrigadrohid, Cork. A grandson of theirs, John Henry, resided at Dripsey Castle and another, George, at Carhue House. Their granddaughter Peggy married Alfred Greer and they were residing at Dripsey Castle during the 1870s, with Greer having purchased part of the Dripsey estate, advertised for sale in October 1851, and comprising over 1900 acres. Their daughter Georgina succeeded to Dripsey Castle, and in 1878 married Robert Walter Travers Bowen, who took the additional name of Colthurst in 1882. It was their son, Captain John Bowen-Colthurst, who ordered the shooting of Francis Sheehy-Skeffington in 1916. He was court-martialled, but successfully pleaded insanity. The family were subsequently boycotted, and ultimately left Dripsey Castle. The O'Shaughnessy family bought the castle in 1922. It was sold in 2015 for €2m to 'an overseas buyer'.

The Irish Tourist Association survey of 1944 held Dripsey Castle to be the principal residence in the parish, and built c. 1746 by the Colthurst family. Within the drawing-room was a carved marble mantlepiece, and in the breakfast room a bookcase said to be made from timber originating in Carrigadrohid Castle.

At the entrance gate is a detached, single-storey gate lodge, built c. 1850,  and a circular ornamental tower (folly) built c. 1840 having a crenellated parapet and rubble stone walls.  Within a wood a short distance to the south is a square tower of roughly same date as the house.

Dripsey Castle remains a private residence, and is not accessible to the public, but its gardens are sometimes used for local events.

See also
Dripsey Castle Bridge
Trafalgar Monument, Carrignamuck
Colthurst's Bridge
Larchfield House, Carrignamuck

References

Country houses in Ireland